is a Japanese former wrestler who competed in the 1972 Summer Olympics. He is the father of Miyuu Yamamoto, Norifumi Yamamoto and Seiko Yamamoto.

References

External links
 

1945 births
Living people
Olympic wrestlers of Japan
Wrestlers at the 1972 Summer Olympics
Japanese male sport wrestlers
20th-century Japanese people